This is the discography documenting albums and singles released by Cantopop singer Jinny Ng.

Studio albums

Extended play

Compilation album

Singles

As lead singer

Soundtrack appearance

Music videos

2010

2011

2012

2013

2014

2015

2016

2017

As featuring artist

2016

Writing credits

References

Discographies of Hong Kong artists
Pop music discographies